Kiel is the capital and most populous city in the northern German state of Schleswig-Holstein, with a population of 246,243 (2021).

Due to its geographic location in the southeast of the Jutland peninsula on the southwestern shore of the Baltic Sea, Kiel has become one of Germany's major maritime centres, known for a variety of international sailing events, including the annual Kiel Week, which is the biggest sailing event in the world. Kiel is also known for the Kiel Mutiny, when sailors refused to board their vessels in protest against Germany's further participation in World War I, resulting in the abdication of the Kaiser and the formation of the Weimar Republic. The Olympic sailing competitions of the 1936 and the 1972 Summer Olympics were held in the Bay of Kiel.

Kiel has also been one of the traditional homes of the German Navy's Baltic fleet, and continues to be a major high-tech shipbuilding centre. Located in Kiel is the GEOMAR – Helmholtz Centre for Ocean Research Kiel at the University of Kiel. Kiel is an important sea transport hub, thanks to its location on the Kiel Fjord (Kieler Förde) and the busiest artificial waterway in the world, Kiel Canal (Nord-Ostsee-Kanal). A number of passenger ferries to Sweden, Norway, Lithuania and other countries operate from here. Moreover, today Port of Kiel is a popular destination for cruise ships touring the Baltic Sea.

Kiel's recorded history began in the 13th century. Before then, in the eighth century, it was a Danish village. Until 1864 it was administered by Denmark in personal union. In 1866 the city was annexed by Prussia and in 1871 it became part of Germany.

Kiel was one of the founding cities of the original European Green Capital Award in 2006. In 2005 Kiel's GDP per capita was €35,618, which is well above Germany's national average, and 159% of the European Union's average.

History

Middle Ages 
Kiel Fjord and the village of Kiel was probably the last settled by Vikings who wanted to colonise the land that they had raided, and for many years they settled in German villages. This is evidenced by the geography and architecture of the fjord. The city of Kiel was founded in 1233 as Holstenstadt tom Kyle by Count Adolf IV of Holstein, and granted Lübeck city rights in 1242 by Adolf's eldest son, John I of Schauenburg. As a part of Holstein, Kiel belonged to the Holy Roman Empire and was situated only a few kilometres south of the Danish border.

The capital of the county (later duchy) of Holstein, Kiel was a member of the Hanseatic League from 1284 until it was expelled in 1518 for harbouring pirates. The Kieler Umschlag (trade fair), first held in 1431, became the central market for goods and money in Schleswig-Holstein. It began to decline circa 1850 and ceased in 1900, but it has recently been revived.

Modern times 
The University of Kiel was founded on 29 September 1665 by Christian Albert, Duke of Holstein-Gottorp. A number of important scholars, including Theodor Mommsen, Felix Jacoby, Hans Geiger and Max Planck, studied or taught there.

From 1773 to 1864, the town belonged to the king of Denmark. However, because the king ruled Holstein as a fief of the Holy Roman Empire only through a personal union, the town was not incorporated as part of Denmark proper. Thus Kiel belonged to Germany, but it was ruled by the Danish king. Even though the empire was abolished in 1806, the Danish king continued to rule Kiel only through his position as Duke of Holstein, which became a member of the German Confederation in 1815. When Schleswig and Holstein rebelled against Denmark in 1848 (the First Schleswig War), Kiel became the capital of Schleswig-Holstein until the Danish victory in 1850.

During the Second Schleswig War in 1864, Kiel and the rest of the duchies of Schleswig and Holstein were conquered by a German Confederation alliance of the Austrian Empire and the Kingdom of Prussia. After the war, Kiel was briefly administered by both the Austrians and the Prussians, but the Austro-Prussian War in 1866 led to the formation of the Province of Schleswig-Holstein and the annexation of Kiel by Prussia in 1867. On 24 March 1865 King William I based Prussia's Baltic Sea fleet in Kiel instead of Danzig (Gdańsk). The Imperial shipyard Kiel was established in 1867 in the town.

When William I of Prussia became Emperor William I of the German Empire in 1871, he designated Kiel and Wilhelmshaven as Reichskriegshäfen ("Imperial War Harbours"). The prestigious Kiel Yacht Club was established in 1887 with Prince Henry of Prussia as its patron. Emperor Wilhelm II became its commodore in 1891.

Because of its new role as Germany's main naval base, Kiel very quickly increased in size in the following years, from 18,770 in 1864 to about 200,000 in 1910. Much of the old town centre and other surroundings were levelled and redeveloped to provide for the growing city.

Kiel was the site of the sailors' mutiny which sparked the German Revolution in late 1918. Just before the end of the First World War, the German fleet stationed at Kiel was ordered to be sent out on a last great battle with the Royal Navy. The sailors, who thought of this as a suicide mission which would have no effect on the outcome of the war, decided they had nothing to lose and refused to leave the safety of the port. The sailors' actions and the lack of response of the government to them, fuelled by an increasingly critical view of the Kaiser, sparked a revolution which caused the abolition of the monarchy and the creation of the Weimar Republic.

During the Second World War, Kiel remained one of the major naval bases and shipbuilding centres of the German Reich. There was also a slave labour camp for the local industry. Owing to its status as a naval port and as production site for submarines, Kiel was heavily bombed by the Allies during this period. The bombing destroyed more than 80% of the remaining old town, 72% of the central residential areas, and 83% of the industrial areas. During the RAF bombing of 23/24 July 1944, Luftwaffe fighters tried to intercept the spoof (i.e. decoy) force instead of the main force attacking Kiel, and there was no water for three days; trains and buses did not run for eight days and there was no gas available for cooking for three weeks. 

There were several bombing raids of the port area during the period 20 February – 20 April 1945 which successfully eliminated many U-boats, and the few large warships (cruisers Hipper, Scheer, and Köln) still afloat at that time. Although the town was beyond the stop-line set for the western Allies in the German surrender at Lüneburg Heath, it and its port, its scientists, and the canal were seized by a British T-Force led by Major Tony Hibbert on 5 May 1945. This forestalled capture of the town by the Soviets, whom the western Allies expected to advance from Germany to Denmark in violation of the Yalta agreement.

Like other heavily bombed German cities, the city was rebuilt after the war. In 1946, Kiel was named the seat of government for Schleswig-Holstein, and it officially became the state's capital in 1952.

Today, Kiel is once again an important maritime centre of Germany, with high-tech shipbuilding, submarine construction and one of the three leading institutions in the field of marine sciences in Europe, the IFM-GEOMAR. Regular ferries to Scandinavia and Lithuania, as well as the largest sailing event in the world called the Kiel Week (Kieler Woche) in German and The Kiel Regatta in English. The Kieler Umschlag is another festival, which has been taking place again since 1975. Kiel is also home to a large service sector and a number of research institutions including the University of Kiel, which is the oldest, largest, and most prestigious university in the state.

Geography

Climate 
Kiel has an oceanic climate (Cfb in the Köppen climate classification).

Districts 
Kiel has about 40 districts, but there is not standard division. The districts are traditionally grouped into 30 boroughs (Stadtteile). Another, more recent structure summarizes the districts in 18 political districts (Ortsteile). The city has 25 electoral districts.

The biggest districts, by population, are Gaarden (23,000), Mettenhof (20,000) and Elmschenhagen (17,000). Gaarden, located at the southern end of the fjord, is a traditional working-class district that used to be home to mainly shipyard workers. Mettenhof is a large housing estate (satellite town) that was built in the 1960s and 1970s on the western outskirts of the city.
The city districts of Düsternbrook, Schreventeich, Ravensberg and Blücherplatz, north of the city centre, are popular places to live with many 19th century buildings, villas and tree-lined streets. The government offices, ministries and parliament of the state of Schleswig-Holstein are also mainly based in these neighbourhoods, particularly Düsternbrook. In contrast to the heavy bomb damage inflicted on the central parts of the city during the Second World War, most of the residential areas were not severely damaged. Hence, Kiel's more modern-style inner city and Kiel's more historic/elaborate residential areas stand in architectural contrast to one another.

There are plans for large-scale improvement and building efforts for the inner city, providing better pavements, better access to and view of the waterfront, and a generally more attractive feel to the place. These plans, most notably the "Kleiner Kiel Kanal", a restoration of a historic canal that was filled in to make place for road infrastructure, are to be implemented in the next few years.

The largest groups of foreign residents by 31.12.2018 are listed below:

Main sights

The oldest building in the city is the 13th century Church of St. Nicholas, which has a sculpture by Ernst Barlach in front of it called Geistkämpfer.

Kiel is Schleswig-Holstein's largest city, and therefore Kiel's shopping district is a major attraction, and will see further improvement and renovation efforts in the upcoming years. Kiel's Holstenstraße (Holsten Street) is one of the longest shopping streets in Germany. The Rathaus (Town Hall), which was built in 1911, has an operating paternoster lift and the design of its tower was based on one in Venice. The square in front of it is bordered by a lake and the Opernhaus Kiel (Kiel Opera House). There are also a number of lakes and parks in the city centre, such as Schrevenpark. There are two botanical gardens, the Old Botanical Garden and the Botanischer Garten der Christian-Albrechts-Universität zu Kiel (or New Botanical Garden).

As Kiel is situated near the sea, the beaches to the north of Kiel, such as Strande, Kiel-Schilksee, Möltenort and Laboe, are also popular places to visit in spring and summer.

Kiel Week, also known in English as the Kiel Regatta, is the largest sailing event in the world and takes place every year in the last full week in June. Many thousands of boats and ships of all kinds and eras take part in the parade. Kiel Week is also a festival, Volksfest and fair as well as a maritime event. There are a number of yachting and sailing clubs in picturesque settings.

Kiel also features a number of museums, including zoological, geological, historical, fine art, industrial and military museums. Notable is the Stadt- und Schifffahrtsmuseum Warleberger Hof (City and Maritime Museum), which belongs to the association museen am meer. In addition to preserving architecture from the 16th century and historic rooms with painted stucco ceilings, it displays urban and cultural exhibits of the 19th and 20th centuries. Particularly intriguing is the history of the carnival in Kiel. 

The Schifffahrtsmuseum is in the former fish market building in the harbour.

Laboe is home to the Laboe Naval Memorial and the Second World War submarine , which are both popular tourist sites.

Politics

Mayor 
The current mayor of Kiel is Ulf Kämpfer of the Social Democratic Party (SPD). The most recent mayoral election was held on 29 October 2019, and the results were as follows:

! colspan=2| Candidate
! Party
! Votes
! %
|-
| bgcolor=| 
| align=left| Ulf Kämpfer
| align=left| Social Democratic Party
| 48,033
| 65.8
|-
| bgcolor=| 
| align=left| Andreas Ellendt
| align=left| Christian Democratic Union
| 14,776
| 20.3
|-
| bgcolor=| 
| align=left| Björn Thoroe
| align=left| The Left
| 6,643
| 9.1
|-
| bgcolor=| 
| align=left| Florian Wrobel
| align=left| Die PARTEI
| 3,513
| 4.8
|-
! colspan=3| Valid votes
! 72,965
! 99.3
|-
! colspan=3| Invalid votes
! 500
! 0.7
|-
! colspan=3| Total
! 73,465
! 100.0
|-
! colspan=3| Electorate/voter turnout
! 193,653
! 37.9
|-
| colspan=7| Source: City of Kiel
|}

City council 

The Kiel city council governs the city alongside the Mayor. The most recent city council election was held on 6 May 2018, and the results were as follows:

! colspan=2| Party
! Votes
! %
! +/-
! Seats
! +/-
|-
| bgcolor=| 
| align=left| Social Democratic Party (SPD)
| 26,617
| 29.9
|  5.8
| 18
|  1
|-
| bgcolor=| 
| align=left| Christian Democratic Union (CDU)
| 20,987
| 23.5
|  6.2
| 14
|  1
|-
| bgcolor=| 
| align=left| Alliance 90/The Greens (Grüne)
| 18,215
| 20.4
|  2.8
| 12
|  3
|-
| bgcolor=| 
| align=left| The Left (Die Linke)
| 6,437
| 7.2
|  3.8
| 4
|  2
|-
| bgcolor=| 
| align=left| Free Democratic Party (FDP)
| 5,764
| 6.5
|  2.6
| 4
|  2
|-
| bgcolor=| 
| align=left| Alternative for Germany (AfD)
| 5,293
| 5.9
| New
| 3
| New
|-
| bgcolor=| 
| align=left| South Schleswig Voters' Association (SSW)
| 2,521
| 2.8
|  0.6
| 2
| ±0
|-
| bgcolor=| 
| align=left| Die PARTEI
| 2,278
| 2.6
| New
| 2
| New
|-
| bgcolor=| 
| align=left| Pirate Party Germany (Piraten)
| 1,011
| 1.1
|  1.9
| 1
|  1
|-
| colspan=7 bgcolor=lightgrey| 
|-
| 
| align=left| Independent
| 36
| 0.0
| New
| 0
| New
|-
! colspan=2| Valid votes
! 89,159
! 99.1
! 
! 
! 
|-
! colspan=2| Invalid votes
! 766
! 0.9
! 
! 
! 
|-
! colspan=2| Total
! 89,925
! 100.0
! 
! 59
!  6
|-
! colspan=2| Electorate/voter turnout
! 196,334
! 45.8
!  8.7
! 
! 
|-
| colspan=7| Source: City of Kiel
|}

Culture

Sports 
There are a number of sports venues in Kiel, most notably the Wunderino Arena (formerly known as Baltic Sea Hall or Ostseehalle), which is the home ground of one of the most successful team handball clubs in the world and multiple German champion, THW Kiel. There is currently no Bundesliga football club in Kiel, but 2. Bundesliga side Holstein Kiel plays at Holstein-Stadion.

Education and scientific research 
The University of Kiel (German: Christian-Albrechts-Universität) was founded by Duke Christian Albrecht in 1665. It is the only full university of Schleswig-Holstein, with about 25.000 students. Partly linked to the University Kiel are other independent research facilities such as the German National Library of Economics – Leibniz Informationcenter for Economy, the Kiel Institute for the World Economy, the GEOMAR Helmholtz Centre for Ocean Research Kiel and the research institute of the Bundeswehr for water sound and geophysics. Besides these there are other educational institutions such as the Fachhochschule Kiel (founded in 1969) and the Muthesius School of Arts (founded in 1907). The projects Murmann School of Global Management and Economics and Multimedia Campus Kiel were ultimately unsuccessful. The Wirtschaftsakademie Schleswig-Holstein offers besides advanced training at the Berfusakademie dual study courses for economists, business information specialists and industrial engineers.

Noteworthy as departmental research institute is the federal institute for dairy research which was merged into the Max-Rubner-Institut together with other institutions in 2004. The state capital Kiel is a corporative sponsoring member of the Max Planck Society.

The ARGE-SH, the oldest research institution of the republic of Germany, has its headquarters in Kiel.

There are twelve gymnasiums in Kiel, of which the Kieler Gelehrtenschule, founded in 1320 as a humanistic gymnasium, is the oldest. Other secondary schools include the Gymnasium Elmschenhagen and the Max-Planck-Schule with a focus on natural sciences. There are many comprehensive schools – partially with secondary schools – all over the city area, as well as private schools.

Economy and infrastructure 

Kiel's economy is dominated by the service sector, transport and maritime industries. Kiel is also one of the major ports of the German Navy, and a leading centre of German high-tech military and civil shipbuilding. Kiel is the home of Howaldtswerke-Deutsche Werft, a shipyard founded in 1838 famed for its construction of submarines. HDW built the first German submarine Brandtaucher in 1850, and is today a subsidiary of ThyssenKrupp Marine Systems, the leading German group of shipyards.

Statistics 

In 2005, the GDP per person was €35,618, which is well above the national average of Germany and 159% of the European Union average.

Notable companies 

Some of the most notable companies having branches or their headquarters in Kiel are:

Ferry operators
 DFDS Seaways
 Stena Line
 Color Line

Military contractors
 Raytheon
 Rheinmetall
 ThyssenKrupp Marine Systems (through their subsidiary Howaldtswerke-Deutsche Werft)

Engineering and industrial machinery
 Heidelberger Druckmaschinen
 Voith
 Vossloh
 Caterpillar Inc. (through their subsidiary MaK)

Others
 LaserSoft Imaging
 Schenker AG
 HSH Nordbank

Kiel is also home to several insurances and banks, most notably the HSH Nordbank, Provinzial NordWest, Förde Sparkasse, Kieler Volksbank eG and Evangelischen Bank eG.

There is also an active startup scene in Kiel with startup accelerator StarterKitchen and startups like SciEngines GmbH, Real-Eyes, myBoo, SealMedia, Cliplister, Druckpreis.DE, promotionbasis.de, Yoosello, GetAnEdge, Flowy Apps, fraguru, lokalportal, PianoMotion and ubique art.

Kiel is home to several media companies, including a branch of the Norddeutscher Rundfunk producing one radio channel and several local programmes in Kiel, a station of the British Forces Broadcasting Service, the daily newspaper Kieler Nachrichten and several smaller local radio channels and magazines.

Transport

Kiel is situated near an important pan-European motorway, the A7, which connects northern Europe with central and southern Europe.

The central railway station, Kiel Hauptbahnhof, has hourly trains to Hamburg, Lübeck, Flensburg, and Husum. The Intercity Express (ICE) connects Kiel with Berlin, Frankfurt, Cologne and Munich. There are 8 regional railway stations within the city proper, which are connected with each other, the main railway station Kiel Hbf and other stations by regional trains, which can be used within the boundaries of the city with a normal bus ticket.

The city's bus service is provided by local company KVG. Autokraft and Verkehrsbetriebe Kreis Plön providing regional bus service, and the Schlepp- und Fährgesellschaft Kiel provides public transport on the fjord with ferries.

The Port of Kiel is a significant port for passenger and cargo shipping from Germany to Scandinavia, the Baltic States and Russia. Passenger ferries operate to and from Gothenburg in Sweden (Stena Line, 13 hours, daily), Oslo in Norway (Color Line, 19 hours, daily), and Klaipėda in Lithuania (DFDS Lisco, 21 hours, 6 times per week). Cargo ferries operate from and to Saint Petersburg in Russia (DFDS Lisco, twice a week), and Kaliningrad in Russia (NSA, once a week).

There is a shuttle bus service (KIELIUS) operating between Hamburg Airport and Kiel central railway station. There is also an airport at Lübeck.

Notable people

Twin towns – sister cities

Kiel is twinned with:

 Aarhus, Denmark (2019)
 Antakya, Turkey (2012)
 Brest, France (1964)
 Coventry, United Kingdom (1947)
 Gdynia, Poland (1985)
 Kaliningrad, Russia (1992)
 Moshi Rural District, Tanzania (2009)
 Samsun, Turkey (2010)
 San Francisco, USA (2017)
 Sovetsk, Russia (1992)
 Stralsund, Germany (1987)
 Tallinn, Estonia (1986)
 Vaasa, Finland (1967)

See also

 Kiel, Wisconsin
 Steenbek-Projensdorf

References

External links

  
 Official tourism site

 Official website of the association museen am meer

 
1233 establishments in Europe
Cities in Schleswig-Holstein
German state capitals
Members of the Hanseatic League
Populated coastal places in Germany (Baltic Sea)
Populated places established in the 13th century
Port cities and towns in Germany
Port cities and towns of the Baltic Sea